Pirojpur-1 is a constituency represented in the Jatiya Sangsad (National Parliament) of Bangladesh since 2019 by SM Rezaul Karim of the Awami League.

Boundaries 
The constituency encompasses Nazirpur, Pirojpur Sadar, and Nesarabad upazilas.

History 
The constituency was created in 1984 from the Bakerganj-14 constituency when the former Bakerganj District was split into four districts: Bhola, Bakerganj, Jhalokati, and Pirojpur.

Ahead of the 2008 general election, the Election Commission redrew constituency boundaries to reflect population changes revealed by the 2001 Bangladesh census. The 2008 redistricting altered the boundaries of the constituency.

Ahead of the 2014 general election, the Election Commission swapped Zianagar Upazila from Pirojpur-1 to Pirojpur-2, and Nesarabad Upazila from Pirojpur-2 to Pirojpur-1.

Members of Parliament 
Key

Elections

Elections in the 2010s 
AKMA Awal was re-elected unopposed in the 2014 general election after opposition parties withdrew their candidacies in a boycott of the election.

Elections in the 2000s

Elections in the 1990s

References

External links
 

Parliamentary constituencies in Bangladesh
Pirojpur District